The Desert Mountain League is a high school athletic league that is part of the CIF Southern Section. Member schools are located around the high desert of California, covering the very sparsely populated regions from Acton in northern Los Angeles County, San Bernardino County, the eastern edge of Kern County, Inyo County and Mono County.

Members
 Boron High School -- Boron, California
 Desert Christian High School -- Lancaster, California
 Lone Pine High School -- Lone Pine, California
 Mammoth High School -- Mammoth Lakes, California
 Mojave High School -- Mojave, California
 Silver Valley High School -- Yermo, California
 Vasquez High School -- Acton, California

References

External links 
 

CIF Southern Section leagues